Bean Blossom Township is one of eleven townships in Monroe County, Indiana, United States. As of the 2010 census, its population was 2,916 and it contained 1,184 housing units.

History
Secrest Ferry Bridge was listed on the National Register of Historic Places in 1996.

Geography
The White River defines the northwest boundary of the township.

Cities, towns, villages
 Ellettsville (northwest edge)
 Stinesville

Unincorporated towns
 Mount Tabor at

Cemeteries
The township contains these four cemeteries: Ellett, King, Mount Carmel and Van Buskirk.

Major highways
  Indiana State Road 46

School districts
 Richland-Bean Blossom Community School Corporation

Political districts
 Indiana's 4th congressional district
 State House District 46
 State Senate District 37

References
 
 United States Census Bureau 2008 TIGER/Line Shapefiles
 IndianaMap

External links
 City-Data.com page for Bean Blossom Township

Townships in Monroe County, Indiana
Bloomington metropolitan area, Indiana
Townships in Indiana